Yavitero or Paraene is an extinct Maipurean language of Venezuela.

Phonology

References

External links
Yavitero language dictionary online from IDS (select simple or advanced browsing)

Indigenous languages of the South American Northern Foothills
Arawakan languages